Lock and Dam No. 21 is a lock and dam located at Quincy, Illinois on the Upper Mississippi River around river mile 324.9. In 2004, the facility was listed in the National Register of Historic Places as Lock and Dam No. 21 Historic District, #04000181 covering , 1 building, 4 structures, 4 objects.

Currently there is a study being conducted by the city of Quincy to convert Lock & Dam No. 21, 20, and 22 into being hydroelectric by 2016.

See also
 Public Works Administration dams list

References

External links

Lock and Dam No. 21 - U.S. Army Corps of Engineers

Dams completed in 1938
Transportation buildings and structures in Adams County, Illinois
Buildings and structures in Marion County, Missouri
Dams in Missouri
Dams in Illinois
21
Mississippi River locks
National Register of Historic Places in Adams County, Illinois
United States Army Corps of Engineers dams
Transport infrastructure completed in 1938
Historic American Engineering Record in Illinois
Historic American Engineering Record in Missouri
Roller dams
Gravity dams
Dams on the Mississippi River
21
21
Mississippi Valley Division
Historic districts on the National Register of Historic Places in Illinois
Buildings and structures in Quincy, Illinois
21
1938 establishments in Illinois
1938 establishments in Missouri